Magia Blanca (born June 26, 1993) is a Mexican luchador enmascarado, or masked professional wrestler, previously known by the ring name Magnifico I. He is currently working with Consejo Mundial de Lucha Libre (CMLL), where he is the current Mexican National Welterweight Champion.

He is a fourth-generation wrestler, the nephew of Apóstol Jr. and cousin of wrestlers Bandido and Myzteziz Jr. His real name is not a matter of public record as is often the case with masked wrestlers in Mexico.

Career
Magia Blanca made his in-ring debut on June 19, 2011, in his hometown of Torreón, then under the name Magnifico I. Along with their cousin Magnifico II, they formed the group Los Magnificos. The first mach they had was against Vientos Negros. Soon, they founded the trio Reyes del Aire with another relative, Angelikal. The trio wrestled extensively high on the match cards in Coahuila and Durango in 2012 and 2013.

In 2015, he was signed to Consejo Mundial de Lucha Libre (CMLL) and he was repackaged as Magia Blanca (Spanish for "White Magic"), without changing the design of the mask. After spending the fall of 2015 wrestling at the promotions's minor events in Puebla and Guadalajara, he made his debut in Mexico City on March 22, 2016, during the La Gran Alternativa tournament, which pits an experienced wrestler against a rookie. Magia Blanca teamed up with his trainer Último Guerrero and they made it to the quarter-finals. In 2018, he won the Copa Nuevos Valores tournament, a tournament for new talent in CMLL. In the finals, he defeated Flyer, which earned him a title match against Soberano Jr. over the Mexican National Welterweight Championship. However, Magia Blanca lost that bout two fall to one. At the Gran Alternativa tournament, Flyer gained a measure of revenge where he and Volador Jr. defeated Magia Blanca and Atlantis from the tournament. On May 24 it was revealed that Magia Blanca had suffered a knee injury during a match and would not be able to work for six to nine months.

Since 2022, he is part of the villainous stable Los Depredadores alongside Diamond, Magnus, Rugido and Volador Jr. On June 24, 2022, he won the National Welterweight Championship, since Soberano Jr. vacated the title to move up to middleweight. Magia Blanca defeated nine other wrestlers in a tournament to become the new champion.

Championships and accomplishments
Consejo Mundial de Lucha Libre
Mexican National Welterweight Championship (1 time, current)
Copa Nuevos Valores (2018)

References

External links

1993 births
Living people
Mexican male professional wrestlers
Masked wrestlers
People from Torreón
Professional wrestlers from Coahuila
Unidentified wrestlers